Michael Rudy Nikkerud (born, 13 March 1983), known professionally as Rudy Nikkerud, is an Australian Pentecostal worship leader and singer in the Planetshakers band.

Biography
Rudy Nikkerud studied music and earned a BA from the University of Tasmania, Australia. At 16, Rudy dedicated his life to serving Jesus after a life-changing encounter with God at a Planetshakers conference. Later he moved to Melbourne, where he became part of Planetshakers Church at its inception. Rudy currently serves as a pastor in the Planetshakers Church and is also a worship leader of the Planetshakers band.

Personal life
Rudy Nikkerud married Chelsi on 1 November 2010 and together they have a daughter named Aria Lorraine.

Discography

As featured artist 
 2018: I Am Loved – Sound of Praise (feat. Rudy Nikerrud).

References

Singers from Melbourne
Planetshakers Church
Planetshakers members
21st-century Australian male singers
21st-century Christians
Australian gospel singers
Australian Pentecostals
Performers of contemporary worship music
Australian Charismatics
1986 births
Living people